You Saw Them Here First is a British television show that aired on ITV from 31 July 2013. Episodes were narrated by Robert Webb in 2013 and 2014.

In 2015 and 2016, the show was narrated by John Thomson. The theme tune used on the programme was a track called Brass in Action, composed by Keith Mansfield.

Episodes

Guests
Celebrities who've appeared on You Saw them Here First include: Mark Benton, Brian Blessed, Michelle Collins, Kate Garraway, Sherrie Hewson, Eamonn Holmes, Lesley Joseph, Lorraine Kelly, Patsy Kensit, Barbara Knox, Phillip Schofield, Alison Steadman, Janet Street-Porter, Chris Tarrant, Kimberley Walsh and Arabella Weir.

External links
.

2013 British television series debuts
2016 British television series endings
ITV (TV network) original programming
Television series by ITV Studios
English-language television shows